The United Nations Educational, Scientific and Cultural Organization (UNESCO) World Heritage Sites are places of importance to cultural or natural heritage as described in the UNESCO World Heritage Convention, established in 1972. Cultural heritage consists of monuments (such as architectural works, monumental sculptures, or inscriptions), groups of buildings, and sites (including archaeological sites). Natural features (consisting of physical and biological formations), geological and physiographical formations (including habitats of threatened species of animals and plants), and natural sites which are important from the point of view of science, conservation or natural beauty, are defined as natural heritage. The Republic of Korea (South Korea) accepted the convention on 14 September 1988, making its historical sites eligible for inclusion on the list. , there are 15 World Heritage Sites in South Korea, and a further 13 on the tentative list.

The first three sites of South Korea, the Haeinsa Temple, Jongmyo Shrine, and Seokguram Grotto and Bulguksa Temple, were inscribed on the list at the 19th Session of the World Heritage Committee, held in Berlin, Germany, in 1995. The most recent site listed was Getbol, Korean Tidal Flats, in 2021. Getbol and the Jeju Volcanic Island and Lava Tubes are natural sites; the other 13 sites are cultural.



World Heritage Sites
UNESCO lists sites under ten criteria; each entry must meet at least one of the criteria. Criteria i through vi are cultural, and vii through x are natural.

Tentative list
In addition to sites inscribed on the World Heritage List, member states can maintain a list of tentative sites that they may consider for nomination. Nominations for the World Heritage List are only accepted if the site was previously listed on the tentative list. As of 2022, South Korea maintains 13 properties on its tentative list.

See also 
 List of South Korean tourist attractions

References

South Korea
World Heritage Sites
 
World Heritage Sites